Everything's Alright Forever is the second album by English indie rock band the Boo Radleys, released in 1992.

Critical reception

Newsday called Everything's Alright Forever a "rewarding journey through light and dark, acoustic serenity brushing against pure white noise." The Calgary Herald determined that "buried beneath several coats of mind-gliding guitar are some of the catchiest pop songs this side of Teenage Fanclub."

The Rough Guide to Rock wrote that the album was "clear evidence that the band were developing" and that it contained "excellent pop tunes behind the array of effects pedals."

Track listing

Early copies of the vinyl edition came with a free 7" single Sunfly.

Personnel

The Boo Radleys
Sice - vocals
Rob Cieka - drums, percussion
Tim Brown - bass guitar, keyboards
Martin Carr - guitar, keyboards, vocals

References

External links

Everything's Alright Forever at YouTube (streamed copy where licensed)

The Boo Radleys albums
1992 albums
Creation Records albums
Columbia Records albums
Albums produced by Ed Buller